Gymnothorax philippinus is a moray eel found in the western Pacific Ocean around the Ryukyu Islands and the Philippines. It was first named by Jordan and Seale in 1907, and reaches a maximum length of 60 cm.

References

philippinus
Fish described in 1907
Taxa named by David Starr Jordan
Taxa named by Alvin Seale